Kazuhiko Hosokawa (born 28 December 1970) is a Japanese professional golfer.

Career
Hosokawa has won eight tournaments on the Japan Golf Tour and featured in the top 100 of the Official World Golf Rankings. He has also played in The Open Championship three times where his best performance came in 2000; finishing T70.

Professional wins (10)

Japan Golf Tour wins (8)

Japan Golf Tour playoff record (1–4)

Japan Challenge Tour wins (1)
1994 Korakuen Cup (1st)

Japan PGA Senior Tour wins (1)
2021 Cosmohealth Cup Senior Golf Tournament

Results in major championships

Note: Hosokawa only played in The Open Championship.
CUT = missed the half-way cut
"T" = tied

Results in World Golf Championships

1Cancelled due to 9/11

"T" = Tied
NT = No tournament

References

External links

Japanese male golfers
Japan Golf Tour golfers
Sportspeople from Ibaraki Prefecture
1970 births
Living people
20th-century Japanese people
21st-century Japanese people